The Cook County, Illinois, general election was held on November 5, 2002.

Primaries were held on March 19, 2002.

Elections were held for Assessor, Clerk,  Sheriff, Treasurer, President of the Cook County Board of Commissioners, all 17 seats of the Cook County Board of Commissioners, all 3 seats of the Cook County Board of Review, three seats on the Water Reclamation District Board, and judgeships on the Circuit Court of Cook County.

Election information
2002 was a midterm election year in the United States. The primaries and general elections for Cook County races coincided with those for federal (Senate and House) and those for state elections.

Voter turnout

Primary election
Voter turnout in Cook County during the primaries was 36.69%. The city of Chicago saw 39.87% turnout and suburban Cook County saw 33.40% turnout.

General election
The general election saw 52.12% turnout, with 1,423,403 ballots cast. Chicago saw 53.16% turnout and suburban Cook County saw 51.09% turnout.

Assessor 

In the 2002 Cook County Assessor election, incumbent Assessor James Houlihan, a Democrat first appointed in 1997 who was reelected in 1998, was again reelected.

Primaries

Democratic

Republican

General election

Clerk 

In the 2002 Cook County Clerk election, incumbent third-term Clerk David Orr, a Democrat, was reelected.

Primaries

Democratic

Republican

General election

Sheriff 

In the 2002 Cook County Sheriff election, incumbent third-term Sheriff Michael F. Sheahan, a Democrat, was reelected.

Primaries

Democratic

Republican

General election

Treasurer 

In the 2002 Cook County Treasurer election, incumbent first-term Treasurer Maria Pappas, a Democrat, was reelected.

Primaries

Democratic

Republican

General election

President of the Cook County Board of Commissioners 

In the 2002 President of the Cook County Board of Commissioners election, incumbent second-term President John Stroger, a Democrat, was reelected.

Stroger was only the forth person ever to win three elections for president of the Cook County Board of Commissioners.

Primaries

Democratic

Republican

General election

Cook County Board of Commissioners 

The 2002 Cook County Board of Commissioners election saw all seventeen seats of the Cook County Board of Commissioners up for election to four-year terms.

As these were the first elections held following the 2000 United States Census, the seats faced redistricting before this election.

1st district

Incumbent first-term Commissioner Earlean Collins, a Democrat, was reelected.

Primaries

Democratic

Republican
No candidates, ballot-certified or formal write-in, ran in the Republican primary. The Republican Party ultimately nominated Robin Lee Meyer.

General election

2nd district

Incumbent fourth-term Commissioner Bobbie L. Steele, a Democrat, was reelected, running unopposed in both the primary and general election.

Primaries

Democratic

Republican
No candidates, ballot-certified or formal write-in, ran in the Republican primary.

General election

3rd district

Incumbent Commissioner Jerry Butler, a Democrat who first assumed the office in 1985, was reelected, running unopposed in both the primary and general election.

Primaries

Democratic

Republican
No candidates, ballot-certified or formal write-in, ran in the Republican primary.

General election

4th district

Incumbent Commissioner John Stroger, a Democrat, was reelected.

Primaries

Democratic

Republican

General election

5th district

Incumbent second-term Commissioner Deborah Sims, a Democrat, was reelected.

Primaries

Democratic

Republican

General election
Republican primary winner Daniel "Dan" Wooten withdrew and was not replaced on the ballot.

6th district

Incumbent first-term Commissioner William Moran, a Democrat, unsuccessfully sought reelection. Joan Patricia Murphy defeated him for the Democratic nomination, and won the general election unopposed.

Incumbent Moran had been a perennial candidate who, in the 1998 general election, had won an upset victory over incumbent then-Republican Barclay "Bud" Fleming.

Barclay "Bud" Fleming, who had been ousted in 1998, also unsuccessfully sought the Democratic nomination for this election.

Primaries

Democratic

Republican
No candidates, ballot-certified or formal write-in, ran in the Republican primary.

General election

7th district

Incumbent second-term Commissioner Joseph Mario Moreno, a Democrat, was reelected.

Primaries

Democratic

Republican
No candidates, ballot-certified or formal write-in, ran in the Republican primary. The Republican Party ultimately nominated Juan Moreno.

General election

8th district

Incumbent second-term Commissioner Roberto Maldonado, a Democrat, was reelected, running unopposed in both the primary and general election.

Primaries

Democratic

Republican
No candidates, ballot-certified or formal write-in, ran in the Republican primary.

General election

9th district

Incumbent second-term Commissioner Peter N. Silvestri, a Republican, was reelected.

Primaries

Democratic

Republican

General election

10th district

Incumbent first-term Commissioner Mike Quigley, a Democrat, was reelected.

Primaries

Democratic

Republican
No candidates, ballot-certified or formal write-in, ran in the Republican primary.

General election

11th district

Incumbent Commissioner John P. Daley, a Democrat in office since 1992, was reelected.

Primaries

Democratic

Republican

General election

12th district

Incumbent fourth-term Commissioner Ted Lechowicz, a Democrat, sought reelection, but was defeated in the Democratic primary by Forrest Claypool, who went on to win the general election.

Primaries

Democratic

Republican
No candidates, ballot-certified or formal write-in, ran in the Republican primary.

General election

13th district

Incumbent second-term Commissioner Calvin Sutker, a Democrat, sought reelection, but was defeated in the Democratic primary by Larry Suffredin, who went on to win the general election.

Primaries

Democratic
In what was regarded to be an upset, Sutker unseated incumbent Suffredin.

Republican
No candidates, ballot-certified or formal write-in, ran in the Republican primary. The Republican Party ultimately nominated Robert D. Shearer, Jr.

General election

14th district

Incumbent first-term Commissioner Gregg Goslin, a Republican, was reelected.

Primaries

Democratic

Republican

General election

15th district

Incumbent seventh-term Commissioner Carl Hansen, a Republican, was reelected.

Primaries

Democratic

Republican

General election

16th district

Incumbent Commissioner Allan C. Carr, a Republican, sought reelection, but was defeated in the Republican primary by Tony Peraica, who went on to win the general election.

Primaries

Democratic
Melrose Park Village President Ronald M. Serpico won the Democratic primary, defeating lawyer William Edward Gomolinski, Patrick "Chico" Hernandez and Stephen J. Mazur.

Republican

General election

17th district

Incumbent fourth-term Commissioner Herb Schumann, a Republican, sought reelection, but was defeated in the Republican primary by Elizabeth Ann Doody Gorman, who went on to win the general election.

Primaries

Democratic

Republican

General election
Democratic primary winner Candice Marie Morrison withdrew before the election.

Cook County Board of Review

In the 2002 Cook County Board of Review election, all three seats, two Democratic-held and one Republican-held, were up for election.

Beginning with the 2002 elections, the Cook County Board of Review has had its three seats rotate the length of terms. In a staggered fashion (in which no two seats have coinciding two-year terms), the seats rotate between two consecutive four-year terms and a two-year term.

As this was the first elections held following the 2000 United States Census, the seats faced redistricting before this election.

1st district

Incumbent first-term member Maureen Murphy, a Republican, was reelected, being unopposed in both the Republican primary and general election. This election was to a four-year term.

Primaries

Democratic
No candidates, ballot-certified or formal write-in, ran in the Democratic primary. The Democratic Party ultimately nominated Brendan F. Houlihan.

Republican

General election

2nd district

Incumbent first-term member Joseph Berrios, a Democrat, was reelected, running unopposed in both the Democratic primary and the general election. Berrios had not only served since the Board of Review was constituted in 1998, but had also served on its predecessor organization, the Cook County Board of (Tax) Appeals, for ten years. This election was to a four-year term.

Primaries

Democratic

Republican
No candidates, ballot-certified or formal write-in, ran in the Republican primary.

General election

3rd district

Incumbent first-term member Robert Shaw, a Democrat, was reelected. This election was to a two-year term.

Primaries

Democratic

Republican
No candidates, ballot-certified or formal write-in, ran in the Republican primary.

General election

Water Reclamation District Board 

In the 2006 Metropolitan Water Reclamation District of Greater Chicago  election, three of the nine seats on the Metropolitan Water Reclamation District of Greater Chicago board were up for election in an at-large race. Since three six-year seats were up for election, voters could vote for up to three candidates and the top-three finishers would win.

Two Democratic incumbents Kathy Meany and Cynthia Santos, won reelection. They were joined in being elected by fellow Democrat Frank Avila. One Democratic incumbent, Martin Sandoval, had withdrawn ahead of the Democratic primary.

Primaries

Democratic

Republican

General election

Judicial elections
Partisan elections were held for judgeships on the Circuit Court of Cook County, due to vacancies. Other judgeships had retention elections.

Partisan elections were also held for subcircuit courts judgeships due to vacancies. Other judgeships had retention elections.

Other elections
Coinciding with the primaries, elections were held to elect both the Democratic and Republican committeemen for the suburban townships.

See also 
 2002 Illinois elections

References 

Cook County
Cook County, Illinois elections
Cook County 2002
Cook County